Limacia cockerelli is a species of sea slug, a dorid nudibranch, a shell-less marine gastropod mollusc in the family Polyceridae.

Distribution 
This species is found from the West coast of North America, ranging from Vancouver Island, British Columbia, Canada to San Diego. It was also reported in the Gulf of California at Bahía de los Ángeles but those records are now known to be the similar species Limacia mcdonaldi.

Description
It has long dorsal papillae with orange-red tips and white branchial plumes with red tips. There is a  broad band of white tubercles down the middle of the dorsum which may sometimes have a small spot of orange at the apex. The second form, found in areas south of Point Conception has tubercles that are in a mid-dorsal line, slightly longer and tipped with orange. Another form in California has large red blotches on the dorsum. The eggs of Limacia cockerelli are pink and develop after 17 days (at ) into hatching planktotrophic veligers. It was thought likely that the southern form represented a species complex. This was confirmed in 2017 with the description of Limacia mcdonaldi.

Diet
This animal preys exclusively on the orange-brown coloured bryozoan, Hincksina velata.

Taxonomy 
First described by Frank MacFarland in 1905 and originally named Laila cockerelli in honour of Theodore D. A. Cockerell.

References

Further reading
 Vallès, Y.; Valdés, A.; Ortea, J. 2000. On the phanerobranch dorids of Angola (Mollusca, Nudibranchia): A crossroads of temperate and tropical species. Zoosystema, 22(1): 15-31.
 Behrens, D.W. (1991) Pacific Coast Nudibranchs. Sea Challengers: Monterey, California.
 Goddard, J.H.R. (1984) The opisthobranchs of Cape Arago, Oregon, with notes on their biology and a summary of benthic opisthobranchs known from Oregon. The Veliger, 27(2): 143-163.
 Goddard, J.H.R. (1987) Observations on the opisthobranch mollusks of Punta Gorda, California, with notes on the distribution and biology of Crimora coneja. The Veliger, 29(3): 267-273.
 Goddard, J.H.R. (1998) A summary of the prey of nudibranch molluscs from Cape Arago, Oregon. Opisthobranch Newsletter, 24: 11-14.
 McDonald, G.W. (1983) A review of the nudibranchs of the California coast. Malacologia, 24: 114-276.
 McDonald, G.R. & Nybakken, J.W. (1978) Additional notes on the food of some California nudibranchs with a summary of known food habits of California species. The Veliger, 21(1): 110-119.

Polyceridae
Western North American coastal fauna
Marine fauna of the Gulf of California
Gastropods described in 1905